John Lindley (1799–1865) was an English botanist

John Lindley may also refer to:

John Lindley (British Army officer) (1860–1925), British general
John Lindley (cinematographer) (born 1951), American cinematographer
John Lindley (rugby league) (1933–2019) English rugby league footballer who played in the 1950s and 1960s
John F. Lindley (1918–1971), American politician